Diphosphane, or diphosphine, is an inorganic compound with the chemical formula P2H4.  This colourless liquid is one of several binary phosphorus hydrides.  It is the impurity that typically causes samples of phosphine to ignite in air.

Properties, preparation, reactions
Diphosphane adopts the gauche conformation (like hydrazine, less symmetrical than shown in the image) with a P−P distance of 2.219 angstroms. It is nonbasic, unstable at room temperature, and spontaneously flammable in air.  It is only poorly soluble in water but dissolves in organic solvents.  Its 1H NMR spectrum consists of 32 lines resulting from an A2XX'A'2 splitting system.

According to an optimized procedure, hydrolysis of 400 g of CaP at −30 °C gives about 20 g of product, slightly contaminated with phosphine.

Reaction of diphosphane with butyllithium affords a variety of condensed polyphosphine compounds.

Organic diphosphanes
A variety of organic derivatives of diphosphane are known.  These species are prepared by reductive coupling, e.g. tetraphenyldiphosphine from chlorodiphenylphosphine:
2 ClPPh2  +  2 Na   →   Ph2P−PPh2  +  2 NaCl
The methyl compound P2Me4 is prepared by the reduction of Me2P(S)−P(S)Me2, which is produced by methylation of thiophosphoryl chloride with methylmagnesium bromide.

See also
 Pnictogen hydride

References

Phosphorus hydrides
Foul-smelling chemicals